The Testa del Leone (3,715 m; Italian, lit. "lion head") is a mountain of the Pennine Alps, located on the border between Switzerland and Italy. It lies on the main Alpine watershed, west of the Matterhorn.

References

External links
Testa del Leone on Hikr

Mountains of the Alps
Alpine three-thousanders
Mountains of Italy
Italy–Switzerland border
International mountains of Europe
Mountains of Valais
Mountains of Switzerland